Cannings Foods Limited was a Trinidad and Tobago company founded in 1912 by Ernest Canning, a British-born businessman.

The enterprise began as a grocery store.  Then it introduced dairy products (including ice cream), baked goods, poultry processing, and soft drinks.

Cannings acquired the Coca-Cola franchise for Trinidad in 1939.  The supermarket HiLo, started in 1950, was the first self-service store in Trinidad and Tobago.  Cannings was taken over by Neal and Massy in 1975.

In the 1990s, the Cannings Group ceased to operate – with the exception of the HiLo supermarket.  The Cannings soft drink brand was sold to Coca-Cola, and continues to be produced.

Cannings, and its relationship with Coca-Cola, are treated in fictionalized (and renamed) fashion in V. S. Naipaul's 1967 novel The Mimic Men.

References

Food and drink companies of Trinidad and Tobago
Coca-Cola brands